Livio Cori (born 12 March 1990) is an Italian rapper and actor.

In 2015 he released his breakthrough single "Tutta la notte", featuring Ghemon, and published his first EP Delay in 2017. He signed in with label Sugar Music in 2018 and released his debut album Montecalvario (Core senza paura) on 8 February 2019.

He participated at the Sanremo Music Festival 2019 with the song "Un'altra luce", together with Nino D'Angelo.

As an actor, he played the role of O' Selfi in fifteen episodes of the TV series Gomorrah (2017–2019).

Discography

Studio albums 
 Montecalvario (Core senza paura) (2019)
 Femmena (2020)

EPs 
 Delay (2017)
 Montecalvario (2018)
 Blu verano (2021)

Singles 
 "Ora" feat. Ntò (2013)
 "Mai" (2013)
 "Amnesia" (2014)
 "Tutta la notte" feat. Ghemon (2015)
 "Veleno" (2016)
 "Non c'è fretta" (2016)
 "Surdat" (2017)
 "Nennè" (2018)
 "Un'altra luce" with Nino D'Angelo (2019)
 "A casa mia" feat. Samurai Jay (2019)
 "Adda passà" feat. CoCo (2019)
 "Abracadabra" feat. La Zero (2020)
 "Nu vase tuoje" feat. Francesco Da Vinci and Nathys (2020)
 "Vasm" feat. Eris Gacha (2021)
 "Verano" (2021)

References

Italian rappers
Living people
21st-century Italian  male singers
1990 births
Musicians from Naples
Male actors from Naples